Joseph Niouky (born March 28, 1986 in Pikine) is a Senegalese footballer who currently plays for Jersey Express in the USL Premier Development League.

Club career

Senegal
Niouky began his career with ASC Diaraf in Senegal, with whom he played for four seasons. He moved to top Senegalese side Port Autonome in 2006, where he established himself as one of the league's top central midfield players.

United States
On February 23, 2010, the New England Revolution officially announced the signing of Niouky, as an addition to their midfield. On August 11, 2010, Niouky was released by the Revolution, nearly six months after signing with the club, having played in just 13 MLS games.

Having been unable to secure a contract with a professional club elsewhere, Niouky signed to play with Jersey Express in the USL Premier Development League in 2011. He made his debut for the team on May 14, 2011. in their 2011 season opener, a 3-0 win over the Westchester Flames.

References

External links
footballdatabase.eu
footmercato.net

1986 births
Living people
Senegalese footballers
Serer sportspeople
ASC Jaraaf players
Port Autonome players
New England Revolution players
Jersey Express S.C. players
Major League Soccer players
USL League Two players
Expatriate soccer players in the United States
Association football midfielders